Jiřice may refer to places in the Czech Republic:

Jiřice (Nymburk District), a municipality and village in the Central Bohemian Region
Jiřice (Pelhřimov District), a municipality and village in the Vysočina Region
Jiřice u Miroslavi, a municipality and village in the South Moravian Region
Jiřice u Moravských Budějovic, a municipality and village in the South Moravian Region